Baron Edmond Ferdinand Felix Euchariste Marie Ghislain de Gaiffier d'Hestroy was a Belgian Ambassador. Born into a noble family, he served as ambassador in Paris, where he died in 1935.

Honours 
 1931 : Knight Grand Cross in the Order of the Crown.
 Knight Grand Cross of the Order of Leopold II
 Grand Officer of the Order of Leopold.
 Knight Grand Cross of the Legion of Honour.
 Knight Grand Cross of the Order of Saint-Charles.
 Knight Grand Cross of the Order of the Star of Romania
 Knight Grand Cross of the Order of the Crown of Romania
 1st Class of the Imperial Order of the Double Dragon.
 Commander of the Royal and Distinguished Spanish Order of Charles III
 Commander of the Military Order of Christ
 Commander of the Order of Our Lady of Conception of Vila Vicosa.

References

External links
 

Grand Crosses of the Order of the Crown (Belgium)
Grand Crosses of the Order of Saint-Charles
Grand Crosses of the Order of the Star of Romania
Grand Crosses of the Order of the Crown (Romania)
Grand Crosses of the Order of Christ (Portugal)
Commanders of the Order of the Immaculate Conception of Vila Viçosa
Ambassadors of Belgium to France